Richard Albert Doyle (March 26, 1930 – April 7, 2003) was an American football defensive back who played two seasons for two different teams, the Pittsburgh Steelers and the Denver Broncos of the AFL and NFL. He was drafted by the Pittsburgh Steelers of the 27th round of the 318th pick.  He played college football at Ohio State University for the Ohio State Buckeyes football team.

References

1930 births
2003 deaths
Players of American football from Maryland
American football defensive backs
Pittsburgh Steelers players
Denver Broncos (AFL) players
Ohio State Buckeyes football players
People from Cambridge, Maryland